The 42nd Wisconsin Infantry Regiment was a volunteer infantry regiment that served in the Union Army during the American Civil War.

Service
The 42nd Wisconsin was organized at Milwaukee, Wisconsin, and mustered into Federal service on September 7, 1864.

The regiment was mustered out on June 20, 1865.

Casualties
The 42nd Wisconsin suffered 58 enlisted men who died of disease, for a total of 58 fatalities.

Commanders
 Colonel Ezra T. Sprague

See also

 List of Wisconsin Civil War units
 Wisconsin in the American Civil War

References

The Civil War Archive

External links
 42nd Wisconsin Volunteer Infantry Regiment from the Civil War Index.

Military units and formations established in 1864
Military units and formations disestablished in 1865
Units and formations of the Union Army from Wisconsin
1864 establishments in Wisconsin